The 2020–21 Kayserispor season was the club's 55th season in existence and the club's sixth consecutive season in the top flight of Turkish football. In addition to the domestic league, Kayserispor participated in this season's editions of the Turkish Cup. The season covered the period from July 2020 to 30 June 2021.

Players

First-team squad

Out on loan

Transfers

In

Out

Pre-season and friendlies

Competitions

Overview

Süper Lig

League table

Results summary

Results by round

Matches

Turkish Cup

Statistics

Goalscorers

References

External links

Kayserispor seasons
Kayserispor